Copernicia tectorum is a palm which is native to Colombia and northern Venezuela, where it is known as palma llanera.

References

tectorum
Trees of Colombia
Trees of Venezuela